Richard Abel may refer to:

 Richard Owen Abel (born 1941), cultural historian and professor of comparative literature
 Richard Abel (lawyer) (born 1941), American professor of law
 Richard Abel (musician) (born 1955), Canadian instrumental musician and pianist
 Richard Abel (politician), American politician from New Hampshire
 Richard F. Abel (born 1933), retired brigadier general in the United States Air Force

See also
 Richard Abels (born 1951), American historian